This is a list of computer systems based on the Micro Channel architecture that were  manufactured by IBM. Such third-party computers were also referred to as PS/2 clones or MCA clones. The first third-party Micro Channel–based computer was Tandy Corporation's 5000 MC in July 1988. Despite expensive research and development costs on the part of third-party manufacturers of Micro Channel computers—in part due to the expensive licensing fees incurred by IBM in order to allow legal use of their technology—by 1990 most MCA clones were not fully compatible with the Micro Channel architecture or expansion cards and peripherals based on Micro Channel. By the time IBM was winding down the PS/2 line of personal computers (which in 1987 acted as the means of introducing Micro Channel to the general public) in 1992, NCR Corporation remained one of the few committed vendors of MCA clones.

Systems

See also
 List of IBM PS/2 models

Notes

References

IBM PS/2
Third-party Micro Channel computers